Auckland Island is the main island of the eponymous uninhabited archipelago in the Pacific Ocean. It is part of the New Zealand subantarctic area. It is inscribed in the UNESCO World Heritage list together with the other New Zealand Subantarctic Islands in the region.

Geography 

It was formed 25 to 10 million years ago from a huge volcanic pile which formed two domes – one centred around Carnley Harbour in the south and another (the Ross Dome) around Disappointment Island to the west. The island is made of volcanic scoria, blanketed in over 2m of peat.

At the western side a very narrow channel known as Victoria Passage separates the main island from the smaller Adams Island.

Flora 

There are 233 species of vascular plant on the Auckland Islands; 163 are indigenous and 23 are exotic. Eight species are endemic to the group. There are distinct vegetation zones. There is a band of Southern rata Metrosideros umbellata around the coast apart from on the western side, the height of which is determined by the shelter, aspect and degree of the slope. The rata forest may extend into the Chionochloa tussock grasslands but in most places merges into a thick band of low, tight scrub dominated by Dracophyllum longifolium, Ozothamnus vauvilliersii and Myrsine divaricata. This scrub band is almost impenetrable and in places is dense enough to walk on top of.

An expedition report from 1907 describes the scrub thusly: 

The scrub band breaks into patches and transitions into extensive grassland of Chionochloa antarctica which in turn merges into a sparsely vegetated fellfield community on the most exposed alpine areas. The megaherbs Anisotome antipoda, Anisotome latifolia, Bulbinella rossii, Pleurophyllum criniferum, Pleurophyllum hookeri, Pleurophyllum speciosum and Stilbocarpa polaris were historically found from the coast into the alpine, however the distribution and populations of these species have been severely impacted by the actions of introduced pigs.

Marine mammals 
Port Ross at the north end of Auckland Island is the only breeding site for the New Zealand population of southern right whales. Up to 400 may be found in the harbour during the winter months, and are regularly surveyed by the University of Otago.

A breeding population of New Zealand sea lions is found on the island. 80% of the total population live and breed in the archipelago. The New Zealand Department of Conservation has conducted an annual survey of the population on the islands since 1994.

Bird life 
The island is part of the Auckland Island group Important Bird Area (IBA), identified as such by BirdLife International because of the significance of the group as a breeding site for several species of seabirds.

The Gibson's albatross Diomedea antipodensis gibsoni, Auckland shag Leucocarbo colensoi, Auckland teal Anas aucklandica, Auckland rail Lewinia muelleri and Auckland snipe Coenocorypha aucklandica are all endemic to the Auckland Island group. Of these only shags are currently breeding on main Auckland Island, in areas where introduced cats and pigs cannot access their nests.

The Auckland Island merganser Mergus australis went extinct in 1902. The population is thought to have been 20–30 breeding pairs prior to predation by introduced pigs and cats. The last specimen was collected as a museum specimen in January 1902.

Introduced species 
There are currently introduced pigs, cats and mice on Auckland Island. Auckland Island is the only island within the New Zealand Subantarctic Island Area with invasive mammalian pests. A project proposed by the Department of Conservation aims to remove these pests from the island, with feasibility trials started in 2018.

DNA analysis suggests that mice—Mus musculus—did not colonise Auckland Island from a New Zealand population but instead arrived with whalers or sealers from North America. They eat invertebrates, seeds, other plant material, native fish eggs and can eat bird eggs and chicks. They severely deplete invertebrate populations, reduce the seedbank, eat seedlings & plants and compete with birds for food resources.

Domestic cats—Felis catus—were first recorded at Terror Cove in 1840, presumably introduced by sealers, but most likely arrived in the two decades prior to this. The impact of cats on the birds of Auckland Island was first noted by the Coastwatchers, who tamed some for company – the Ranui Station cats were recorded to kill 60 Antarctic prions over three months in 1942. Ornithologist Brian Bell found that prions were confined to cliff faces at Crozier Point in 1962 and noted "any bird landing...[fell] an immediate prey to the feral cats.". Gut content and scat analysis show that cats are feeding on small passerines and seabirds. A cat was seen feeding on a pre-fledging juvenile white-capped mollymawk at South West Cape.

Goats were introduced to the Auckland Islands several times in the second half of the nineteenth century, to serve as a source of food for castaway sailors, with at least one liberation in 1865 on the main Auckland Island. By the 1970s, only one population remained, a group of about 100 based on the northwest side of Port Ross, in the north-east of the main island. Browsing by goats caused significant damage to lowland tussock Chinochloa antarctica in particular. In 1986 and 1987, over 60 animals were removed from the island for captive breeding in New Zealand. A decision was made to eradicate the remaining animals, an operation which was completed by 1992. An investigation in 1999 into the fate of the translocated animals in New Zealand found that the breed had become extinct.

Pigs—Sus scrofa—were first introduced at Port Ross in the north of Auckland Island in 1807 by Captain Abraham Bristow and several further liberations occurred in the 19th century. The pigs were intended as a food source for shipwreck survivors and sealers. Auckland Island pigs are a feral race of domestic pigs which are considered a distinct breed by the Rare Breeds Conservation Society of New Zealand. Pigs have had a severe impact on populations of megaherbs, with populations of these plants on Auckland Island being almost totally depleted by the early 1900s.

Dunnocks, common redpolls, Eurasian blackbirds, song thrushes and common starlings which were introduced onto mainland New Zealand have naturally established on Auckland Island.

Oleria lyalli is a tree asterad native to New Zealand which may have arrived with humans in the 19th century. It is spreading from a historic settlement site at Erebus Cove and covers neighbouring Ewing Island. Harakeke Phormium tenax is found at Erebus Cove, Sealer's Creek, Ranui Cove and Tandy Inlet, and was introduced probably by the second wave of sealers to visit the island, to make rope, twine, baskets, mats etc. kormiko Veronica salicifolia was first reported in 1975 around the Lindley Point farmhouse site at Deas Head, built in 1851.

Human presence on the island 
There is archaeological evidence that the Auckland Islands were briefly settled and abandoned by Polynesians around 600–700 years ago. Māori and Moriori from the Chatham Islands settled at Ranui Cove from 1842 till 1856. Auckland Island was the site of the failed settlement of Hardwicke, which was founded in 1849 but survived only three years before being disbanded in 1852.

The Grafton survivors lived for 18 months on the island before building a boat and sailing to New Zealand; the Invercauld survivors camped in the remains of Hardwicke; and all but three died before being rescued.

The German transit of Venus expedition of 1874 made observations from Terror Cove in Port Ross.

Coastwatchers from the Cape Expedition were stationed on the island from March 1941 to October 1945. Two stations were constructed: One at Ranui Cove in outer Port Ross and another at Tagua, on Musgrave Peninsula in Carnley Harbour. A base at Waterfall Inlet was the mooring point for the Ranui which serviced the stations.

See also 

 List of Antarctic and subantarctic islands
 List of islands of New Zealand
 List of islands
 New Zealand subantarctic islands
 Desert island

Footnotes 

Auckland Islands
Important Bird Areas of the Auckland Islands
Islands of the Auckland Islands
Uninhabited islands of New Zealand